Mary Vermuyden Wheelhouse ( – ) was a British painter, illustrator, toymaker and suffragette.

Biography
Mary Wheelhouse was born in Leeds, Yorkshire. She probably studied at the Scarborough School of Art around 1895 and then spent three years studying in Paris at the Académie Delécluse. The Women's International Art Club (WIAC) was founded by students at the Académie Delécluse and Wheelhouse was on the executive commmittee of the WIAC 1904–06 and 1908–1914.  From 1900 Wheelhouse lived in Chelsea and for a time at the same address as the artist Louise Jacobs with whom she ran a shop, Pomona Toys, in Cheyne Walk, supplying children's toys to Fortnum's, Liberty's and Harrods. They exhibited toys at the 1916 Arts and Crafts exhibition. She illustrated a large number of books and children's books, primarily by women writers including George Eliot, Juliana Horatia Ewing, George Sand and Elizabeth Gaskell.

Wheelhouse campaigned for women's suffrage and was a board member of the Artists' Suffrage League, founded in 1907.

Notes

References

External links

Mary Vermuyden Wheelhouse (1867-1947), Chris Beetles Gallery, with gallery of Wheelhouse's works

1868 births
1947 deaths
British women painters
British women illustrators
Toy inventors
English suffragettes
20th-century British painters
20th-century British women artists
Artists from Leeds